Great National Assembly or Grand National Assembly may refer to:

 Great National Assembly of Alba Iulia, an assembly of Romanian delegates that declared the unification of Transylvania and Romania
 Great National Assembly (Socialist Republic of Romania), the legislature of the Socialist Republic of Romania
 Grand National Assembly of Turkey, the unicameral Turkish legislature
 Grand National Assembly of Bulgaria, a special convention of the National Assembly